Jal Mistry (1923–2000) was a noted Indian cinematographer who worked in Hindi cinema, best known for his collaboration with director Chetan Anand and Navketan Films, in films like  Aakhri Khat (1966), Heer Raanjha (1970) and Kudrat (1981). Besides, hit films like Barsaat (1949) directed by Raj Kapoor and  Naseeb (1981) by Manmohan Desai. He even co-produced Dev Anand starrer, Bombai Ka Babu (1960) with Raj Khosla.

Along with his elder brother, Fali Mistry (1917–1979), the Mistry brothers made a name for themselves in Bollywood. During the extended making of Kamal Amrohi's classic Pakeezah (1972), he also shot some of the scenes, in the absence of principal cinematographer, Josef Wirsching.

He won the Filmfare Award for Best Cinematographer four times, Baharon Ke Sapne (1968), Heer Raanjha (1971), Jheel Ke Us Paar (1974), and Kudrat (1982).

Selected filmography
 Barsaat (1949)
 Jan Pehchan (1950)
 Aandhiyan (1952)
 Uran Khatola (1955)
 Heer (1956)
 Bombai Ka Babu (1960) (also co-producer)
 Aakhri Khat (1966)
 Baharon Ke Sapne (1967)
 Humsaya (1968)
 Heer Raanjha (1970)
 Man Mandir (1971) 
 Bombay to Goa (1972)
 Haar Jeet (1972)
 Jheel Ke Us Paar (1973)
 Bidaai (1974)
 Bhanwar (1976)
 Chalta Purza (1977)
 Naseeb (1981)
 Kudrat (1981)
 Teri Kasam (1982)
 Allah Rakha (1986)
 Itihaas (1987)
 Main Tere Liye (1988)
 Abhimanyu (1989)
 Prem Granth (1996)
 Jhooth Bole Kauwa Kaate (1998)

References

External links
 

1923 births
2000 deaths
Cinematographers from Maharashtra
Artists from Mumbai
Filmfare Awards winners
20th-century Indian photographers